Pine nut oil, also called pine seed oil or cedar nut oil, is a vegetable oil, extracted from the edible seeds of several species of pine. While the oil produced from the seeds of more common European and American pine varieties is mostly used for culinary purposes, Siberian pines (growing in Russia, Mongolia and Kazakhstan), as well as Korean pines (growing mostly in China and North Korea) yield the seeds with the highest content of pinolenic acid, as well as antioxidants associated with medicinal uses.

Culinary uses 
Pine nut oil has a relatively low smoke point, and is therefore not generally used during cooking. Rather, it is added to foods for "finishing", to add flavor. Pine nut oil is also a useful bread preservative when a small amount is added to the dough.

Triglyceride composition 
One analysis of the triglyceride composition of Siberian pine nut oil showed the following composition:

See also

 Phytonutrients
 Phytochemicals

References

Vegetable oils
Nut oils